Nau is the only studio album by Nau, a Brazilian post-punk band founded in 1985 by writer Vange Leonel (vocals), former Zero member Alberto "Beto" Birger (bass), Zique (guitar) and Mauro Sanches (drums, percussion). It was released in 1986 via CBS Records International. Despite its low sales, the album was critically acclaimed and even got the attention of famous singer Cazuza, who became a fan of the band.

According to former guitarist Zique, by 1989 Nau was working on a second album. Eight tracks were recorded for it, but due to lack of promotion and the decline of appreciation of Brazilian rock during the late 1980s and the early 1990s, the album was scrapped and the group disbanded soon after; CBS would be also disestablished in the following year, since it was bought by Sony. Four of the tracks intended for the unproduced second album were available for streaming at the now-defunct official website for Zique. Under the title O Álbum Perdido do Nau, it would only be released in its entirety on November 9, 2018, four years after the death of vocalist Vange Leonel.

"Nau" is the Portuguese word for carrack.

Track listing

Personnel
 Vange Leonel – vocals, rhythm guitar (tracks 1, 3, 6, 7, 8 and 9)
 Mauro Sanches – drums
 Zique – lead guitar
 Alberto "Beto" Birger – bass
 Luiz Carlos Maluly – production
 Roberto Marques – mixing
 Carlinhos Freitas, José Roberto Guarino, Roberto Marques – engineering
 Duda Oliveira, Rui Mendes – photography

References

External links
 Nau at Discogs

1987 debut albums
CBS Records albums
Post-punk albums by Brazilian artists
Portuguese-language albums